Chelsea Public Schools is a school district headquartered in Chelsea, Massachusetts in Greater Boston.

Demographics

At the start of the 2013–2014 school year the district had 5,500 students. Due to a wave of immigrant children entering the district, the enrollment count increased to 6,200 by the end of the year. Dr. Mary Bourque, the superintendent, characterized the increase as "dramatic" and explained that "It’s a big strain in terms of being able to address the needs without knowing ahead of time that those will be the needs." Of the new students, 75 arrived from Arizona and Texas and 285 directly arrived from outside the United States.

Schools

High school 

 Chelsea High School
 Chelsea Opportunity Academy

Middle school 

 Browne Middle School
 Morris H. Siegal Clark Avenue  Middle School
 Eugene Wright Science and Technology Academy

Elementary schools 

William A. Berkowitz Elementary School
Edgar Hooks Elementary School
George F. Kelly Elementary School
Frank M. Sokolowski Elementary School

References

External links
 Chelsea Public Schools

Chelsea, Massachusetts
Schools in Suffolk County, Massachusetts
School districts in Massachusetts